Aconodes montanus is a species of beetle in the family Cerambycidae. It was described by Francis Polkinghorne Pascoe in 1857. It is known from India and Nepal.

References

Aconodes
Beetles described in 1857